Todd Wright (born in Cincinnati, Ohio) is an American sports radio personality.

He founded and hosted ESPN Radio's AllNight with Todd Wright, and was a part of ESPN Radio from 1996 to 2005. Wright then took his popular national show to Sporting News Radio (later Yahoo! Sports Radio) in 2006 where it continued airing until 2012.

In addition, Wright served as host or analyst for multiple college football studio shows, general sports talk programming and Tampa Bay Rays World Series coverage on Sun Sports, a Fox Sports regional cable network in Florida, while also anchoring live tournament coverage for the PGA Tour Network and PGA Tour Entertainment.

Since his retirement from national radio, Wright often guest hosts the Steve Duemig show or other programming on 620 WDAE in Tampa. Wright and Duemig, as well as anchor/producer Darek Sharp, all worked together at WFNS, Tampa Bay's first ever sports talk radio station in the early 1990s.

External links
Todd Wright Tonight on Yahoo Sports Radio
Pro Football Weekly - Column Index
PGA Tour Network Bio

Year of birth missing (living people)
Living people
American sports announcers
American sports radio personalities
American bloggers
American sportswriters
ESPN Radio
Radio personalities from Cincinnati
Major League Baseball public address announcers
21st-century American non-fiction writers